Raphaël Sylvain Mirval (born 4 May 1996) is a Guadeloupean international playing for Italian Serie D club Aglianese.

Club career
He made his professional debut in the Serie B for Perugia on 8 December 2015 in a game against Novara.

International career
Mirval first represented the Guadeloupe national team in a friendly 1–0 loss to Trinidad and Tobago on 23 March 2018.

International goals
Scores and results list Guadeloupe's goal tally first.

References

External links
 

1996 births
Living people
Guadeloupean footballers
French footballers
Association football forwards
A.C. Perugia Calcio players
Aubagne FC players
Serie B players
Serie D players
Guadeloupe international footballers
2021 CONCACAF Gold Cup players
French expatriate footballers
French expatriate sportspeople in Italy
Guadeloupean expatriate footballers
Guadeloupean expatriate sportspeople in Italy
Expatriate footballers in Italy